Pink Memory (stylized as Pink MEMORY) is the second full-length studio album by South Korean girl group Apink. It was released on July 16, 2015. The title track, "Remember", was used to promote the album.

Release and promotion

The full album was released on July 16, 2015.

The promotions of the song "Remember" started on July 16, 2015 on Music Bank. The song is being promoted on the shows, The Show, M! Countdown , Music Core and Inkigayo.

Singles
The first single from the album, "Promise U", was released as a digitally on April 19, 2015.

The album's title track, "Remember", was released on July 16, 2015. The song was written and composed by Shinsadong Tiger.

The album's second single, "Petal", was released on August 3, 2015.

Track listing

Charts

Sales and certifications

References

External links
 
 
 
 

Apink albums
2015 albums
Korean-language albums
Cube Entertainment albums
Kakao M albums